DXNP-TV (channel 11) is a television station in Metro Davao, Philippines, serving as the Mindanao flagship of the government-owned People's Television Network. The station maintains studios at the Mindanao Media Hub, Carlos P. Garcia Highway, Bangkal, Davao while its transmitter is located along Broadcast Ave., Shrine Hills, Brgy. Matina Crossing, Davao.

History
1962 - DXRH-TV channel 11 was launched by Manila Broadcasting Company until the declaration of Martial Law by President Ferdinand Marcos in 1972.
1974 - During the Martial Law era, the station reopened as DXAW-TV and became an owned-and-operated station of the National Media Production Center as Government Television (GTV) under Lito Gorospe and later by then-Press Secretary Francisco Tatad. It was originally broadcast on Channel 2 and it is the first television station in Mindanao.
1992 - Channel 11 was later relaunched as the local station of the Southern Broadcasting Network, with call sign changed to DXNP-TV.
1994 - After 8 years of being silence of the original channel 2 (eventually, it is now owned and handled by The 5 Network), the station was launched by People's Television Network, Inc. (PTNI).
July 16, 2001 - Under the new management appointed by President Gloria Macapagal Arroyo, PTNI adopted the name National Broadcasting Network (NBN) carrying new slogan "One People. One Nation. One Vision." for a new image in line with its new programming thrusts, they continued the new name until the Aquino administration in 2010. It became an originating station in Mindanao.
October 6, 2011 - People's Television Network, Inc. (PTNI) became a primary brand and the branding National Broadcasting Network was retired.
June 2017 - PTV Davao resumed its operations as PTVisMin, with the airing of the first Visayan hourly newsbreak, PTVismin Newsbreak anchored by former ABS-CBN Davao reporter Elric Ayop. The program also aired on the national feed of PTV since October 2017.
October 16, 2017 - PTV Davao launched its own 45-minute local newscast PTV News Mindanao with Jay Lagang and Hannah Salcedo as anchors.
March 5, 2018 - PTV Davao started digital test broadcasts on UHF Channel 45.
December 5, 2020 - PTV Davao Studios and Offices transferred to the new home at the new Mindanao Media Hub in Bangkal, Davao City. Prior to this, in May 2018, the network was ground breaking for the construction of the new Mindanao Media Hub which houses for PCOO's satellite offices along with its attached agencies including PTV Davao and Radyo Pilipinas Davao and the building was finished in the end of November of the same year.

Current programs
PTV News Mindanao (afternoon local newscast)
Madayaw Davao

Digital television

Digital channels

UHF Channel 45 (659.143 MHz)

Areas of coverage

Primary areas 
 Davao City
 Davao del Sur
 Davao del Norte

Secondary areas 
 Portion of Davao de Oro

See also
People's Television Network
List of People's Television Network stations and channels
DWGT-TV - the network's flagship station in Manila.
DXRP-AM
DXRP-FM

References

Television stations in Davao City
People's Television Network
People's Television Network stations
Television channels and stations established in 1962
Digital television stations in the Philippines